Ocean Bay Park is a hamlet in the town of Brookhaven in Suffolk County, New York, United States. It is located on Fire Island, a barrier island separated from the southern side of Long Island by the Great South Bay. To reach Ocean Bay Park, one must take a ferry or water taxi from Bay Shore. 

Housing includes group houses and family homes. Nightlife and full-service restaurants include Flynn's (which also has a 50-boat marina) and the Schooner Inn.

Ocean Bay Park was once filled with college and recently graduated young people, but has since shifted to a more family friendly community. The community has always been home to many somewhat older affluent home owners who enjoy the laid back beauty of Fire Island with family and friends.

The residents of Ocean Bay Park have a history of being on the forefront of social change. On September 2, 1967 Dr. Martin Luther King was the guest of honor at a cocktail party held by Mr. and Mrs. Hyman Abbott as a fundraiser for his work. Earlier that day, Dr. King "spoke about community, the war in Vietnam, anti-Semitism and the need for a third political party." Fifteen hundred residents attended that rally in Seaview.

References

External links
 Ocean Bay Park Association
 Ocean Bay Park Fire Department
 Fire Island Website: News and Travel Guide

Brookhaven, New York
Hamlets in New York (state)
Fire Island, New York
Hamlets in Suffolk County, New York
Populated coastal places in New York (state)